Patrick Combs (born July 5, 1966) is an American author and inspirational speaker. He is the author of Major in Success and Man 1 Bank 0  which was adapted into a one-man live stage show that has toured the United States and Europe. Combs has performed Man 1 Bank 0 to sold out audiences in Ireland and on Broadway.

Combs is an active speaker on the national college circuit, a keynote speaker for a variety of global corporations and a speaker at seminars, public and private events. 

As an occasional reporter and commentator, Combs has appeared on television programs, talk shows and network specials, as well as the cover of the Harlequin Romance novel The Valentine Gift. Combs also made headlines when at age 21 he delivered a stranger’s baby on a sidewalk in San Francisco without any previous medical training

Early life and education  
Combs was raised in Bend, Oregon by a single mother with his older brother Mike Combs. His mother was a nurse until she lost her job after a back injury. The family lived in poverty in a trailer on a single income with support in part by a local church. Combs would take odd jobs to help, including picking strawberries and running daily a paper route. He attended Lewis & Clark College starting in 1984, and graduated San Francisco State University in 1989 with a Bachelor of Arts.

Author 
In 1992 Combs began writing his first book which became his national bestseller, Major in Success. The book, which was published by Ten Speed Press and is distributed by Random House, is currently being distributed in its fifth edition.

As a companion to his live one-man stage show, Man 1 Bank 0, in 2010 Combs wrote a novelization of it.

Speaker 

Combs has made speeches and hosted seminars across the United States and abroad regarding a variety of motivational topics.

Performer 
Combs' one-man show, Man 1 Bank 0 has played sold-out runs at HBO's 2004 U.S. Comedy Arts Festival held in Aspen, at the Spoleto Festival in Charleston (where it garnered "Critic's Choice"), in Winnipeg, and at the Comedy Central Stage in Los Angeles. The show won "Best of Fest" at the San Francisco Fringe where it was awarded "Best Solo Comedy," and was an official selection of the New Zealand International Comedy Festival and an official selection of the Just For Laughs Festival in Montreal. The show sold out in New York during its off-Broadway run at the Lambs Theatre in summer 2015. In 2012 he debuted his one-man show entitled Foolhardy at the Orlando Fringe

Media personality  
Combs has appeared on several national and international television programs, series and specials, including Hard Copy and Real TV. He has also appeared on such talk shows as The View, Donahue, ABC's World News Tonight, NBC Nightly News, “Coast to Coast AM” with Art Bell, Good Morning America, Montel Williams and The Late Show.

Published work 
  Major in Success, Ten Speed Press, 1994
 Gearing Up (Inside & Out) for a Great Life: A Smart Guide for High School, Light Matrix Books, 2003
 Man 1 Bank 0, Art Helix, October 18, 2011

References

1966 births
Living people
Writers from Oregon
People from Bend, Oregon
American writers of Mexican descent
San Francisco State University alumni